The Hudson was an automobile built in Hudson, Michigan by the Bean-Chamberlain Manufacturing Company from 1901 to 1902. It had no relationship to the Hudson Motor Car Company of Detroit, Michigan. The Hudson was a light steamer, with a vertical two-cylinder engine, single chain drive, and tiller steering.

References
 

Steam cars
Motor vehicle manufacturers based in Michigan
Defunct motor vehicle manufacturers of the United States
Lenawee County, Michigan
Veteran vehicles
Vehicle manufacturing companies established in 1901
Vehicle manufacturing companies disestablished in 1902
1901 establishments in Michigan
1902 disestablishments in Michigan
Defunct manufacturing companies based in Michigan